Aper (full name Lucius Flavius Aper, also known as Arrius Aper, date of birth unknown -284) was a Roman citizen of the third century AD. First known to history as a high-flying professional soldier, he went on to serve as an acting provincial governor and finally became Praetorian prefect, under the Emperor Carus - in effect vice principis (a term best understood as 'the emperor's deputy'). This rendered him hugely influential in the government of the empire - not excepting in matters of peace and war.

Aper's career coincided with and benefited from the momentous changes in the structure of the Roman army and the Roman state introduced in the middle years of the third century that brought men such as himself - i.e.  members of the Roman equestrian order with a strong military background - to the fore in the public administration. Almost certainly he would have been a man of considerable ability.

However, as was almost invariably the case with those who rose to the highest levels in the Imperial Service, the main element that fuelled Aper's rise to the highest levels was his access to powerful military and political patronage. In his case this derived from his relationship with Carus which began when they were both serving soldiers and not only survived, but even flourished after Carus's accession to the principate by which time he was already the father-in-law of Carus's son, the future emperor Numerian. On the death of Carus, an event quickly followed by the demise of Numerian, this essential prop to Aper's position was gone. Almost immediately, bad luck and bad judgement brought him into competition for primacy with Diocles, commander of the Domestici and future Emperor Diocletian. This was to have rapid and fatal consequences, not only for Aper's career, but for his very life.

Background

Nothing is known of Aper's origins or the date and circumstances of his birth.

The praenomen and nomen with which Aper is associated (i.e. 'Lucius' and 'Flavius' respectively) are known only from an epigraph commemorating a man named Aper from Poetovio - see below. The epigraph honorand is generally held by modern historians to be identified with the Aper here considered. If the latter's nomen was indeed 'Flavius', it may be remarked that he shared it with the future emperor, Constantius Chlorus. However, no familial relationship between the two men has ever been established.

Aper's cognomen (i.e. 'Aper') translates into English as 'wild boar'. Again, is not known whether this was a diacritic associated with that branch of the Flavian clan to which Aper is thought to have belonged or whether it was a nickname derived from some personal characteristic of the man himself.

Career

Early appointments
As intimated above, Aper is identified with the Aper who was commemorated on the epigraph dated 267-8 found at Poetovio, in Pannonia Superior (now Ptuj, Slovenia). The inscription describes Aper as a vir egregius praepositus  legionum V Macedonicae atque XIII Geminae. Poetovio was an important fortress on the River Sava  which controlled the approaches to Italy through the Julian Alps It cannot be determined whether Aper commanded the fortress garrison or whether he answered to a superior officer who would probably have been styed as a dux The force under Aper's command would have consisted of elements (i.e. vexillationes) of the legions mentioned rather than the legions themselves, (There is no known instance of a praepositus commanding a full legionary establishment, let alone two).

The increasing use of composite formations such as that under Aper was a phenomenon of the mid-third century. Such units were independent of the regular command-structures of the frontier garrisons as traditionally deployed reflecting the strategic reaction of the imperial government to the anarchic situation in the Danube provinces (and also, incidentally, in Mesopotamia and Syria) caused by incessant incursions by northern barbarians (and the forces of the Persian Empire) into Roman territory and savage civil conflicts which were in large measure a consequence of the failure of the imperial government to control such incursions. The traditional deployment of the army in the pre-emptive defense of the frontiers had largely broken down by the 250s in the face of these threats. The new strategy which relied on ad hoc mobile expeditionary forces brought about a great expansion of the command-opportunities for officers of equestrian as opposed to senatorial rank. These were for the most part professional soldiers who had achieved their equestrian status by rising through the ranks of the legionary centurionate.

Aper is also identified with the officer commemorated on an undated epigraph from Aquincum in Pannonia Inferior (modern Budapest, Hungary). There he is shown as a vir egregius agens vices praesidis. This wording indicates that, while his equestrian social status remained the same, Aper was now acting governor of Pannonia Inferior. There is no way of knowing the specific circumstances that had led the Imperial Authorities to give Aper this posting, but the most likely reason was that the local situation required a man with military experience and that no suitable senatorial could be found. As in the case of Aper's earlier appointment in Poetovio, the prevailing disorder made this a problem that increasingly confronted the Imperial government and that, increasingly, the solution was to appoint an equestrian officer pro temp. By 283 it had been possible to find a senator able/willing to do the job in Pannonia Inferior. However, the problem of finding suitable senators to govern devastated provinces was still endemic and under Diocletian's regime the process of making the government of provinces a largely equestrian function was carried to its logical conclusion

Apogée and downfall

At the outset of the reign of the Emperor Numerian (284) a man named Aper (perhaps Arrius Aper) was already en poste as Praetorian Prefect. The Vita Cari also says that he was the father of Numerian's wife. It is probable that this Aper was the same man as the one already noted as praepositus of a detached force and as the former equestrian vice praeses of Pannonia. However, he is thought to have been prefect during the war with Persia initiated by Numerian's father, Carus and he had probably been given that office at the outset of Carus's reign in 282.

Aper is considered likely to have been the unnamed prefect who is said in the Vita Cari to have urged Carus to make war on Persia, hoping that Carus and Numerian would perish and he himself obtain the Purple. It is thus insinuated, but not directly asserted that he was responsible for the death of both men during and after that campaign. The usual caveats are suggested regarding information based on the Augustan History. The truth is unknowable. Historian Pat Southern, points to Aper's scheming as the most likely reason for Carus's unexpected death while campaigning against the Sasanian Empire.

What is incontestable is that when Numerian (who was by that time the Emperor following the death of his father) died as the Imperial comitatus returned from its victorious campaign in Persia. The traditional story is that Aper hid the body in a closed litter, told everyone that the emperor was irritated by the dust and light during the retreat, and issued orders in the emperor's name until the scent of the rotting corpse exposed his scheme.

Aper was accused of his murder by the army and put on trial at Nicomedia (Izmit, Turkey). The suspicion of murder evidently arose because Aper had attempted to conceal the fact of Numerian's death, perhaps while he prepared the ground for his own accession to the Purple. Diocles, commander of the Domestici, then gave early proof of his capacity for ruthless and decisive action (that was to later distinguish him as Emperor) by pronouncing Aper the murderer and executing him on the spot by plunging his sword into his breast, thus giving him no chance to justify himself—or, perhaps, to implicate Diocles in Numerian's demise.

Flavius Vopiscus relates that Diocletian did this to fulfill a prophecy which had been delivered to him by a female druid, "Imperator eris, cum Aprum occideris."

The historian Edward Gibbon was to say of this episode:

A charge supported by such decisive proof was admitted without contradiction and the legions with repeated acclamations acknowledged the justice and authority of the Emperor Diocletian.Historian Pat Southern described Diocletian's story about Aper's scheming as ridiculous. She argued that although unlikely, it is possible that Aper could have lost his nerve because he feared retribution from suspicious soldiers if Carus had actually died of natural causes, and he claimed that the late emperor's son had also died in the same manner shortly afterwards.

Aper's death is placed in autumn 284.

Notes

References

Modern sources

 
  
 
 
 

284 deaths
Ancient Roman generals
3rd-century Romans
Praetorian prefects
Equestrian commanders of vexillationes
Flavii
Arrii
People charged with murder
Executed ancient Roman people
People executed by the Roman Empire
Deaths by blade weapons
People of the Roman–Sasanian Wars
Caran dynasty